State Route 35 (SR 35) is a  state highway in the northeastern part of the U.S. state of Alabama. The southern terminus of the highway is at its intersection with SR 9 in rural Cherokee County northeast of Cedar Bluff and near the Georgia state line. The northern terminus of the highway is at Woodville in Jackson County where it has a second intersection with U.S. Route 72 (US 72).

Route description
North of its southern terminus, SR 35 begins an ascent over Lookout Mountain as a two-lane road. The highway heads in a northwesterly direction as it travels through the Little River Canyon National Preserve along the county line dividing Cherokee County and DeKalb County leading into Fort Payne. As the highway descends Lookout Mountain, within the Fort Payne city limits, it makes a 90-degree right turn at the foot of the mountain. Numerous trucks descending this route have suffered brake failure and wrecked at this turn as a result, causing numerous fatalities. One resident living at this turn, Joe Faulkner, erected a reinforced concrete wall to protect his property. The wall assumed the popular name, "Joe's Truck Stop."

From Fort Payne, SR 35 is routed along a four-lane divided highway as it heads towards Rainsville. The highway is a four-lane highway from its intersection with US 11 in Fort Payne to its intersection with US 72 in Scottsboro, except for a brief stretch from near its intersection with SR 71 in Section, to the foot of Sand Mountain and the east bank of the Tennessee River, where it intersects SR 40. The Alabama Department of Transportation plans to eventually four-lane this remaining section of the Fort Payne–Scottsboro route. The highway crosses the Tennessee River over the Comer Bridge (southbound) and the Bob Jones Bridge (northbound). A new bridge is under construction to replace the Comer Bridge, and was expected to open in 2012, but finally opened May 2016. In the early 1990s, a section of the highway was rerouted from a dogleg extending from Fort Payne through Pine Ridge to Rainsville along the natural slope of Sand Mountain, to the current four-lane route. The current route reaches the brow of Sand Mountain along a ramp through a manmade gap in the side of the mountain.

Until 1980, the northern terminus of SR 35 was at Scottsboro, where it intersected US 72. It was extended westward along the former alignment of US 72 after the U.S. Highway was relocated to a new four-lane highway between Scottsboro and Huntsville. Although SR 35 travels in a south by southwestward trajectory as it leaves Scottsboro, it is signed as “SR 35 north” until its terminus at a second intersection with US 72 at Woodville in western Jackson County.

Major intersections

See also

References

External links

National Park Service: Little River Canyon National Preserve

035
Transportation in Cherokee County, Alabama
Transportation in DeKalb County, Alabama
Transportation in Jackson County, Alabama